The 2019–20 Botola, is the 63rd season of the Premier League and the 9th under its new format of Moroccan Pro League, the top Moroccan professional league for association football clubs, since its establishment in 1956.

Wydad Casablanca came into the season as defending champions of the 2018–19 season. Nahdat Zemamra and Raja Beni Mellal entered as the two promoted teams from the 2018–19 Botola 2.

The season started on 14 September 2019, and was scheduled to end on 1 July 2020. However, the season was suspended in March 2020, due to COVID-19 pandemic in Morocco, then resumed in July and ended in 11 October 2020.

Teams

Stadium and locations

Number of teams by regions

Personnel and kits 

1. On the back of shirt.
2. On the sleeves.
3. On the shorts.  
Additionally, referee kits are made by Adidas.

Managerial changes

League table

Results

Season statistics

Top goalscorers

Top assists

Hat-tricks

(H) – Home ; (A) – Away
4 – Player scored four goals.

See also
2019 Moroccan Throne Cup
2019–20 Botola 2
2019-20 CAF Champions League
2019-20 CAF Confederation Cup
2019–20 Arab Club Champions Cup
Royal Moroccan Football Federation

References

External links 
frmf.ma

Morocco

Botola seasons
Botola
Botola, 2019-20